Charles St George Gore (1 October 1871 – 11 December 1913) was a New Zealand cricketer who played first-class cricket for Wellington from 1891 to 1904.

Life and career
Charles Gore was one of eight children – four sons and four daughters – of Richard Benjamin Gore, who was curator of the Colonial Museum in Wellington, Government Meteorological Observer and Statistician, and Secretary to the Geological Survey Department, the New Zealand Institute and the Wellington Philosophical Society. His brothers Arthur and Ross were, like him, first-class cricketers. All four brothers were prominent tennis players in New Zealand.

A free-scoring batsman who sometimes opened the innings, and a fine fieldsman, Charles Gore played in the New Zealand cricket team's first first-class match, against the touring New South Wales team in 1893–94. He made his highest score of 57 when he and Arnold Williams added 137 for the fourth wicket for Wellington against Canterbury in 1896–97.

A popular member of sporting and social circles in Wellington, he worked in the Crown Lands Office. He died of pneumonia at the age of 42.

References

External links

1871 births
1913 deaths
Cricketers from Wellington City
Wellington cricketers
New Zealand cricketers
Pre-1930 New Zealand representative cricketers
Deaths from pneumonia in New Zealand
North Island cricketers